Aženski Vrh is a settlement in the Municipality of Gornja Radgona in northeastern Slovenia.

References

External links 
Aženski Vrh on Geopedia

Populated places in the Municipality of Gornja Radgona